Setagrotis is a genus of moths of the family Noctuidae.

Species
 Setagrotis pallidicollis (Grote, 1880) (syn: Setagrotis planiforns (Smith, 1890))

 Setagrotis vocalis (Grote, 1879) (syn (homonym): Setagrotis cinereicollis (Grote, 1876))

Former species
 Setagrotis atrifrons is now Tesagrotis atrifrons (Grote, 1873)

References
Natural History Museum Lepidoptera genus database
Setagrotis at funet

Noctuinae